Questions à la terre natale is a 2006 documentary film.

Synopsis 
Where is Africa going to? After forty years of regained independence, the African continent is in turmoil and is struggling with its contradictions, between its desire to be liberated from its colonial supervision and its dependence on the goodwill and the charity of rich countries. This film is a forum through which Africans themselves are asked about the way they see their continent and its leaders.

External links 

2006 films
French documentary films
Senegalese documentary films
2006 documentary films
Documentary films about African politics
2000s French films